Colonel Cluny Macpherson  (March 18, 1879 – November 16, 1966)  was a physician and the inventor of an early gas mask. After World War I he served as the president of the St. John's Clinical Society and the Newfoundland Medical Association.

Early life

Cluny Macpherson was born in St. John's, Newfoundland to Campbell Macpherson and Emma Duder. He had a brother, Harold.

Macpherson received his early education at Methodist College and at the McGill University Faculty of Medicine from 1897–1901 where he earned his degree in Medicine. He also volunteered with the Royal National Mission to Deep Sea Fishermen, which later became known as the Grenfell Mission. Macpherson began his medical career at the Royal Infirmary of Edinburgh. In 1902 he returned to Newfoundland joining the Labrador Mission begun by Dr. Wilfred Grenfell and ran the hospital in Battle Harbour. Remaining there until 1904. He also served as a special constable and justice of the peace.  Macpheron later became a director of the Newfoundland and the International Grenfell Associations. He later helped develop the Seamen's Institute (later called the King George V Institute), another Grenfell project. Returning to St. John's, Macpherson opened a private practice, and eventually became the leading practitioner in Newfoundland.

Macpherson started the first St. John Ambulance Brigade in Newfoundland after working with the St. John Ambulance Association. The Brigade had three divisions in St. John's. When World War I broke out, members enlisted in the Newfoundland Regiment. Macpherson organized the volunteers into an Ambulance Unit, which continued throughout the war.

World War I

At the outset of World War I in August 1914 Macpherson was commissioned as a captain and Principal Medical Officer of the newly formed 1st Newfoundland Regiment. He served as the principal medical officer for the St. John Ambulance Brigade of the first Newfoundland Regiment during World War I. He saw on active service in Belgium and France, at Salonika and later at Gallipoli, and in Egypt. His work was mentioned in despatches twice.

The German army used poison gas for the first time against Allied troops at the Second Battle of Ypres, Belgium on  April 22, 1915. As an immediate response, cotton wool wrapped in muslin was issued to the troops by 1 May and followed by the Black Veil Respirator, a cotton pad soaked in an absorbent solution which was secured over the mouth using black cotton veiling. Seeking to improve on the Black Veil respirator, Macpherson created a mask made of chemical absorbing fabric and which fitted over the entire head. A  canvas hood treated with chlorine-absorbing chemicals, and fitted with a transparent mica eyepiece. Macpherson presented his idea to the War Office Anti-Gas Department on May 10, 1915, with prototypes being developed soon after. The design was adopted by the British Army and introduced as the British Smoke Hood in June 1915; Macpherson was appointed to the War Office Committee for Protection against Poisonous Gases. More elaborate sorbent compounds were added later to further iterations of his helmet (PH helmet), to defeat other respiratory poison gases used such as phosgene, diphosgene and chloropicrin.

After suffering a war injury in Egypt, Macpherson returned to Newfoundland in October 1916. He served as the Director of Medical Services for the Militia. For his wartime services, he was made a Companion of the Order of St Michael and St George in 1918. He retired with the rank of Lieutenant-Colonel.

Later life

Following the war Macpherson had various medical roles including president of the St. John's Clinical Society and the Newfoundland Medical Association. In 1937 he was vice-president of the Newfoundland St. John Ambulance Association in 1937, and later became assistant commissioner of the St. John Ambulance Brigade overseas. Macpherson was also the Registrar of the Newfoundland Medical Board.

During World War II he served in ship convoys in the North Atlantic. He was appointed Honorary Colonel of the 1st Company, Royal Canadian Army Medical Corps in 1957, and was awarded the Canadian Forces Decoration in 1964.

At various times he was chairman of the Lunacy Commissioners, president of the St John Ambulance Council, and vice-president of the Newfoundland Division of the Canadian Red Cross Society. He was a member of the Medical Council of Canada from 1950 and its president in 1954–55. He was appointed a Knight of the British Order of St John of Jerusalem in 1913 and a Knight of Justice in 1955. He was chairman of the Clan Macpherson Association and president of its Canadian branch.

Family

Macpherson married Eleanora Barbara Macleod Thompson, daughter of William Macleod Thompson, of Northumberland County, Ontario on September 16, 1902. They had two children, Emma Allison (1903–1971) and Campbell Leonard (1907–1973). Eleanora was later created OBE and became a Dame of the Order of St John. She died in 1964. Their son, Campbell Leonard, became the third Lieutenant Governor of Newfoundland in 1957, and in 1965 served as president of the Macpherson family business, Royal Stores, Ltd., after the death of his uncle, Harold Macpherson (1884-1963), a breeder and world authority on Newfoundland dogs. Cluny Macpherson lived in St. John's until his death on November 16, 1966.

The family home at 65 Rennie's Mill Road, where he served as secretary, treasurer and registrar for the Newfoundland Medical Society now has historic designation.

Arms

References

Bibliography

Further reading

External links
Reflections of a Newfoundlander - MUN 
Cluny MacPherson biography from About.com

1879 births
1966 deaths
People from St. John's, Newfoundland and Labrador
Canadian military doctors
Canadian inventors
McGill University Faculty of Medicine alumni
Physicians from Newfoundland and Labrador
Newfoundland military personnel of World War I
Royal Newfoundland Regiment officers